The Age of Love (Spanish:La edad del amor) is a 1954 Argentine musical comedy film directed by Julio Saraceni and starring Lolita Torres, Alberto Dalbés and Floren Delbene.

Cast
 Lolita Torres as Soledad Reales "The Spark" / Ana María Rosales		
 Alberto Dalbés as Alberto Mendez Tejada son / Alberto Miranda		
 Floren Delbene as Alberto Mendez Tejada father	
 Domingo Sapelli as Alberto Mendez Tejada grandfather
 Morenita Galé as Marta Bibí
 Ramón Garay as Mr. Mendiondo		
 Mario Faig as Sampietro		
 Luis García Bosch as Capuano	
 Julián Pérez Ávila as Pedro
 Lina Bardo as Elvira García		
 Thelma Jordán as chorus girl		
 Roberto Bordoni	
 Carmen Giménez as Mrs. Laura
 Rafael Diserio as the servant of the Mendez Tejada family

References

Bibliography
 Plazaola, Luis Trelles. South American Cinema: Dictionary of Film Makers. La Editorial, UPR, 1989.

External links
 

1954 films
1950s Spanish-language films
Argentine black-and-white films
Films directed by Julio Saraceni
Films with screenplays by Abel Santa Cruz
Argentine musical comedy films
1954 musical comedy films
1950s Argentine films